, mainly known by his pseudonym , is a Japanese mystery writer. He is one of the representative writers of the new traditionalist movement in Japanese mystery writing and was the first president of the Honkaku Mystery Writers Club of Japan from 2000 to 2005. He has also served as part of the selection committee for various literary awards, most notably the Ayukawa Tetsuya Award from 1996 to 1999 and Edogawa Rampo Prize from 2014 to 2017.

Works in English translation
The Moai Island Puzzle (original title: Kotō Pazuru), trans. Ho-Ling Wong (Locked Room International, 2016)

Awards and nominations
 1996 – Nominee for 49th Mystery Writers of Japan Award for Best Short Story: "Chocho ga Habataku"
 2003 – 56th Mystery Writers of Japan Award for Best Novel: Mare Tetsudo no Nazo (The Malayan Railway Mystery)
 2003 – Nominee for 3rd Honkaku Mystery Award for Best Fiction: Mare Tetsudo no Nazo (The Malayan Railway Mystery)
 2004 – Nominee for 4th Honkaku Mystery Award for Best Fiction: Suisu-dokei no Nazo (The Swiss Watch Mystery)
 2007 – The Best Japanese Crime Fiction of the Year (2007 Honkaku Mystery Best 10): Ran'a no Shima
 2008 – 8th Honkaku Mystery Award for Best Fiction: Jookoku no Shiro (The Castle of the Queendom)
 2008 – The Best Japanese Crime Fiction of the Year (2008 Honkaku Mystery Best 10): Jookoku no Shiro (The Castle of the Queendom)
2016 – 5th Osaka Honma Book Award: Maboroshi-zaka 
 2018 – 3rd Yoshikawa Eiji Collection Award: Himura Hideo Series

Bibliography

Student Alice series (Amateur Detective Egami series)
Novels
 , 1989 (The Moonlight Game: The Tragedy of Y 1988)
 , 1989 (The Moai Island Puzzle. Locked Room International. 2016)
 , 1992 (Double-Headed Devil)
 , 2007 (The Castle of the Queendom)
Short story collection
 , 2012

Writer Alice series (Criminology Professor Himura series)
Novels
 , 1992
 , 1993
 , 1995
 , 1995 (The Swedish House Mystery)
 , 1997
 , 2002 (The Malayan Railway Mystery)
 , 2006
 , 2015
 , 2017
 , 2018 (The Indian Club Mystery)
 , 2022

Short story collections
 , 1994 (The Russian Tea Mystery)
 , 1996 (The Brazilian Butterfly Mystery)
 , 1997 (The English Garden Mystery)
 , 1999 (The Persian Cat Mystery)
 , 2001
 , 2001
 , 2003 (The Swiss Watch Mystery)
 , 2003
 , 2005 (The Moroccan Crystal Mystery)
 , 2008
 , 2008
 , 2010
 , 2012
 , 2013
 , 2014
 , 2019 (The Canadian Coin Mystery)

Sora series (Sorashizu Jun series)
 , 2010
 , 2011
 , 2012

Hamaji Kenzaburou series
 , 2017
 , 2020

Standalone novels
 , 1990
 , 1996
 , 2000
 , 2002
 , 2003

Short story collections
 , 1996
 , 1998
 , 2001
 , 2008
 , 2009
 , 2013
 , 2019

See also

Honkaku Mystery Writers Club of Japan
Japanese detective fiction

References

External links
 Profile at J'Lit Books from Japan

1959 births
20th-century Japanese novelists
21st-century Japanese novelists
Japanese male short story writers
Japanese mystery writers
Japanese crime fiction writers
Japanese horror writers
Mystery Writers of Japan Award winners
Honkaku Mystery Award winners
Living people
Writers from Osaka
Doshisha University alumni
20th-century Japanese short story writers
21st-century Japanese short story writers
20th-century Japanese male writers
21st-century male writers